Never Trouble Trouble is a 1931 British comedy film directed by Lupino Lane and starring Lane, Renee Clama and Jack Hobbs. It was shot at the Cricklewood Studios in London.

Synopsis
An artist, despairing of life, arranges to have himself assassinated only to discover that he has inherited a large sum of money.

Cast
 Lupino Lane as Olvier Crawford  
 Renee Clama as Pam Tweet  
 Jack Hobbs as Jimmie Dawson  
 Wallace Lupino as Mr. Tweet  
 Iris Ashley as Gloria Baxter  
 Dennis Hoey as Stranger  
 Wally Patch as Bill Hainton 
 Lola Hunt as Mrs. Hainton 
 Barry Lupino as Tompkins  
 George Dewhurst as Inspector Stevens 
 Syd Crossley as Minor role
 Merle Oberon as Minor role
 Tom Shale as Minor role

References

Bibliography
 Low, Rachael. Filmmaking in 1930s Britain. George Allen & Unwin, 1985.
Wood, Linda. British Films, 1927–1939. British Film Institute, 1986.

External links
 

1931 films
1931 comedy films
British comedy films
Films shot at Cricklewood Studios
Films directed by Lupino Lane
British black-and-white films
1930s English-language films
1930s British films